R45 is Death Piggy's 3rd and final record before they became absorbed by their side-project GWAR, released in 1985. It has a much more polished sound, due to Russ Bahorsky leaving the group and Steve Douglas replacing him. Russ Bahorsky claimed he was very impressed with the record, stating that "It showed off some of the best production values the band ever managed to achieve" and that "Steve brought a thick, heavy, and polished sound to the group that gave the music a more professional edge".

Track list 
 "Poet" (1:21)
 "Ground 'B' Sound" (2:30)
 "Joey Died Today" (1:47)
 "Minute to Live" (2:57)

Personnel 
Dave Brockie – vocals/bass
Steve Douglas – guitar
Sean Sumner – drums
Released on – Slugtail Records
Produced by – Death Piggy
Recorded at – Radioactive Studios with Victor Benshaw

References 

1985 EPs
Death Piggy albums